Mario Gentili may refer to
Mario Gentili (cyclist, born 1913) (1913–1999), Italian cyclist
Mario Gentili (cyclist, born 1962) (born 1962), Italian cyclist